Fabian Busch (born 1 October 1975) is a German actor. He has appeared in more than sixty films since 1993. Among his best-known films is the film satire Look Who's Back, in which he plays a moviemaker who befriends with Adolf Hitler. He also had supporting roles in Downfall (2004) as Obersturmbannführer Stehr and in The Reader (2008) as Kate Winslet's defense attorney. In addition to acting, Busch also directed and wrote the screenplay for the 2009 short film Edgar.

Selected filmography

References

External links
 

1975 births
Living people
Male actors from Berlin
German male film actors
German male television actors
20th-century German male actors
21st-century German male actors